Guayusta is a former Costanoan settlement in Monterey County, California. Its precise location is unknown.

References

Costanoan populated places
Former Native American populated places in California
Former settlements in Monterey County, California